The Iran women's national under-20 volleyball team represents Iran in women's under-20 volleyball events. It is controlled and managed by the Islamic Republic of Iran Volleyball Federation (IRIVF) that is a member of Asian volleyball body Asian Volleyball Confederation (AVC) and the international volleyball body government the Fédération Internationale de Volleyball (FIVB).

Team

Coaching staff

Current squad

Competition history

World Championship
 1977 – Did not qualify
 1981 – Did not enter
 1985 – Did not enter
 1987 – Did not enter
 1989 – Did not enter
 1991 – Did not enter
 1993 – Did not enter
 1995 – Did not enter
 1997 – Did not enter
 1999 – Did not enter
 2001 – Did not enter
 2003 – Did not enter
 2005 – Did not enter
 2007 – Did not enter
 2009 – Did not enter
 2011 – Did not qualify
 2013 – Did not qualify
 2015 – Did not qualify
 2017 – Did not qualify
 2019 – Did not qualify
  2021 – Did not qualify

Asian Championship
 1980 – Did not enter
 1984 – Did not enter
 1986 – Did not enter
 1988 – Did not enter
 1990 – Did not enter
 1992 – Did not enter
 1994 – Did not enter
 1996 – Did not enter
 1998 – Did not enter
 2000 – Did not enter
 2002 – Did not enter
 2004 – Did not enter
 2006 – Did not enter
 2008 – Did not enter
 2010 – 9th
 2012 – 8th
 2014 – 12th
 2016 – 9th
 2018 – 8th

External links
Official website

W
Women's volleyball in Iran
National women's under-20 volleyball teams